Rodney Strasser (born 30 March 1990) is a Sierra Leonean professional footballer who plays as a midfielder.

Club career

Milan
Born in Freetown, Strasser began his career at local club Kallon, before moving to Italy to join Milan in 2007. During his time in Milan's youth system, he was a member of the under-20 side, who won the 2009–10 Coppa Italia Primavera. He made his first-team debut on 21 December 2008, in a 5–1 win against Udinese, coming on as a substitute for Kakha Kaladze in the 82nd minute.

Genoa
On 20 July 2010, Milan announced that half of the rights to Strasser had been purchased by Genoa for €2.25 million, as part of the deal that saw defender Sokratis Papastathopoulos move to Milan. Strasser, however, would stay at Milan on loan, joining the first-team squad permanently. His first appearance of the season was in a UEFA Champions League group stage 2–0 win against Auxerre – which also marked his debut in European club competition – on 23 November. He went on to score his first professional goal in a 1–0 league win over Cagliari, on 6 January.

Milan return
In May 2011, his co-ownership was dissolved in favour of Milan for the same price and renewed his contract to June 2016. (with Papastathopoulos moved back to Genoa), but Strasser subsequently joined Lecce on loan. He appeared in 13 games and scored one goal for his new team, before suffering a broken ankle in a game against Juventus on 9 January and subsequently being called back to Milan to undergo rehabilitation. He made his return on 10 April, coming on as a substitute in the second half of a game against Chievo, which Milan won 1–0. At the start of the following season, Strasser sustained another injury which would rule him out for three months. After recovering he struggled to get playing time, making only one Coppa Italia appearance before being loaned out to Parma during the January transfer window.

Genoa return
On 27 July 2013, Strasser joined Genoa on a permanent deal for €3.5 million, as part of Kévin Constant's co-ownership resolution in favour of Milan for €6 million. Strasser was loaned out to Serie B team Reggina in August 2013. As of January 2019, Strasser played for the Serie D team Villafranca.

International career 
Strasser made his international debut for the Sierra Leone national team on 5 September 2010, in a 2012 Africa Cup of Nations qualification game against Egypt.

Career statistics

Club 
.

1European competitions include the UEFA Champions League and the UEFA Cup.
2Other tournaments include none to date.

International 
.

Honours
Milan
Serie A: 2010–11

References

External links 
 
 Rodney Strasser at aic.football.it 
 

1990 births
Living people
Sierra Leone Creole people
Sportspeople from Freetown
Sierra Leonean footballers
Sierra Leonean expatriate footballers
Sierra Leone international footballers
A.C. Milan players
U.S. Lecce players
Parma Calcio 1913 players
Genoa C.F.C. players
Reggina 1914 players
S.S. Racing Club Roma players
NK Zagreb players
Gil Vicente F.C. players
A.S.D. Villafranca players
Turun Palloseura footballers
Serie A players
Serie B players
Serie C players
Serie D players
Croatian Football League players
Liga Portugal 2 players
Veikkausliiga players
Sierra Leonean expatriate sportspeople in Italy
Sierra Leonean expatriate sportspeople in Finland
Sierra Leonean expatriate sportspeople in Portugal
Expatriate footballers in Italy
Expatriate footballers in Croatia
Expatriate footballers in Finland
Expatriate footballers in Portugal
Association football midfielders